Defending champion David Wagner and his partner Andrew Lapthorne defeated Dylan Alcott and Lucas Sithole in the final, 6–4, 6–4 to win the quad doubles wheelchair tennis title at the 2014 Australian Open.

Wagner and Nicholas Taylor were the reigning champions, but Taylor did not compete this year as he was ranked outside the world's top 3, and did not receive the event's wildcard.

Seeds
  Andrew Lapthorne /  David Wagner
  Dylan Alcott /  Lucas Sithole

Main draw

Final

References
 Main Draw

Wheelchair Quad Doubles
2014 Quad Doubles